Yves Brunier (born 1943) is a French puppeteer. He is best known for his character, Casimir, an orange colored dinosaur who appears on French Children's TV. He played Chelli in Sacatruc, the French version of Big Bag. Brunier later went to perform on 5, Rue Sésame as Yoyo. He also performed on the Muppet Show TV pilot.

See also
 L'Île aux enfants

References

Living people
French puppeteers
1943 births
Chevaliers of the Ordre des Arts et des Lettres